Fred Hill Jr. (Born March 26, 1959) is an American college basketball coach, most recently an assistant coach for the Seton Hall Pirates men's basketball team. He had previously served as the head men's basketball coach at Rutgers University. His father is Rutgers baseball coach Fred Hill Sr. and his uncle, Brian Hill is a former NBA coach.

Raised in Verona, New Jersey, Hill graduated from Verona High School in 1977.

Hill had a 47–77 record in four years at Rutgers. He recruited and lost 12 players including Mike Rosario, the first McDonald's All American in Rutgers history.

Despite a losing record, Hill had been told after the 2009–10 season that he would return for a fifth season. However, on April 1, Hill got into a shouting match with Pittsburgh baseball coaches after a game between the Panthers and Scarlet Knights.  When athletic director Tim Pernetti learned about it, he ordered Hill to stay away from the remaining games of the Panthers-Scarlet Knights series. Hill showed up for the next day's game, prompting an investigation by Pernetti. After the investigation, Pernetti told Hill he would not be allowed to return. After protracted negotiations, Hill was allowed to resign in return for an $850,000 settlement.

Head coaching record

References

External links 
 Fred Hill Fired. Fox News.

1959 births
Living people
American men's basketball coaches
American men's basketball players
Basketball coaches from New Jersey
Basketball players from New Jersey
College men's basketball head coaches in the United States
College men's basketball players in the United States
Fairleigh Dickinson Knights men's basketball coaches
Lehigh Mountain Hawks men's basketball coaches
Maine Black Bears men's basketball coaches
Marquette Golden Eagles men's basketball coaches
Montclair State University alumni
Northwestern Wildcats men's basketball coaches
People from Verona, New Jersey
Point guards
Rider Broncs men's basketball coaches
Rutgers Scarlet Knights men's basketball coaches
Seton Hall Pirates men's basketball coaches
Shooting guards
Sportspeople from Essex County, New Jersey
Verona High School (New Jersey) alumni
Villanova Wildcats men's basketball coaches